AgapeFest, formerly known as Agape Music Festival, was an annual, Christian music festival in Greenville, Illinois. It featured many Christian musicians and some of today's top Christian bands.  The festival was sponsored by nearby Greenville College and had been student-run since its inception in 1977. AgapeFest was generally held the last weekend in April or first weekend in May, and bands performed from early afternoon Friday until late evening on Saturday. They offered free camping and free parking to attendees. Unfortunately, the festival culminated after 2013's event. Greenville College was unable provide funding for AgapeFest in 2014, and that year's planned festival was not hosted. AgapeFest has not been hosted since and currently has no plans to return as a two-day festival. However, Greenville College hosted Encore Music festival in its place in 2014  and currently brings events such as Propaganda (musician), Noah Gundersen, and the Nashville Contemporary Music Center's Holotour to campus.

Past festivals have featured Christian musicians like TobyMac, Audio Adrenaline, Kutless, Hawk Nelson, Lecrae, Owl City, RunKidRun, BarlowGirl, Salvador, Relient K, Sanctus Real, Newsboys, Jeremy Camp, Falling Up, John Reuben, David Crowder Band, Superchick, Skillet, Five Iron Frenzy, Switchfoot, Jars of Clay, The O.C. Supertones, Petra, Rich Mullins, Whiteheart, Grammatrain, The Waiting, Johnny Q. Public, and many others.

The festival is a member of the Christian Festival Association.

References

External links 
 

Christian music festivals
Contemporary Christian music
Greenville, Illinois
Greenville College
Tourist attractions in Bond County, Illinois
Music festivals established in 1977
1997 establishments in Illinois